Rowing at the Summer Olympics has been part of the competition since its debut in the 1900 Summer Olympics.  Rowing was on the program at the 1896 Summer Olympics but was cancelled due to bad weather. Only men were allowed to compete until the women's events were introduced at the 1976 Summer Olympics in Montreal which gave national federations the incentive to support women's events and catalysed growth in women's rowing. Lightweight rowing events (which have weight-limited crews) were introduced to the games in 1996. 
Qualifying for the rowing events is under the jurisdiction of the World Rowing Federation.  World Rowing predates the modern Olympics and was the first international sport federation to join the modern Olympic movement.

Summary

Events
At the 2016 and other recent Olympics, the following 14 events were contested:
Men: Single sculls, Double sculls, Quadruple sculls, Coxless pair, Coxless four, Eight.
Lightweight Men: Double sculls, Coxless four
Women: Single sculls, Double sculls, Quad sculls, Coxless pair, Eight
Lightweight Women: Double sculls

The lightweight events were threatened in 2002 when the Programme Commission of the IOC recommended that, outside combat sports (boxing and wrestling, but not fencing, shooting, and archery) and weightlifting, there should not be weight-category events. The Executive Board overturned this recommendation and the lightweight rowing has been continued.

To satisfy the IOC's aim for gender equality it has been proposed that from the 2020 Olympics onwards the men's lightweight fours will be removed and the women's coxless fours reintroduced. The IOC accepted that proposal in June 2017.

In the early games (1900 and 1904) there were several other categories of events (Junior, Novice, Association, and Intermediate). A number of other boat classes have made an appearance at several games (sometimes for a long time) but have been subsequently dropped – as recently as the 1990s. The primary loss has been in boats with coxswains, except for the eights, which have always been coxed.  These were:
Men's Coxed Pair (1900–1992)
Men's Coxed Four (1900–1992)
Women's Coxed Four (1976–1988)
Women's Coxed Quad Sculls (1976–1984)
Men's Coxed Four with Inriggers (1912 only)
Six-Man Naval Rowing Boats (1906 only)
17-Man Naval Rowing Boats (1906 only)

Other non-Olympic boatclasses, which still compete in World Championships, are currently: men's & women's lightweight single sculls, lightweight quadruple sculls and lightweight coxless pair.

Race distances
Today all races are raced over a 2000m course, but this did not become standard before the Stockholm Olympics in 1912 (except for London 1948, where the course was 1850m). Before this, it was raced over various distances: the course in Paris in 1900 was 1750m, in St. Louis in 1904 it was 3218m, and in London in 1908 it was 2414m. The 1908 and 1948 events were held over the Henley Royal Regatta course.

Women's races were raced over 1,000m until 1988, when they were changed to 2,000 metres.

Early games featured match races between two or three boats, until the modern six boat side-by-side format was first adopted at the 1936 Olympic Games. With the exception of the 1952 Olympic Games (races between four or five boats), it has been the standard since.

Qualification
There is a limited number of crews permitted to race, so the International Rowing Federation holds qualification events in order to determine who competes at the Olympic Games.  At the Olympic Games, each National Olympic Committee can only have one boat per event.

The main qualification comes from the previous year's World Rowing Championships.  Other qualifying events are called "Continental Qualification Regattas", of which four are held during the year preceding the games - Asia, Africa, Latin America, and Final (open to everyone else).  Each year FISA issues details of how many crews qualify at each regatta.

At the World Championships, the top finishing boats guarantee a place for that country - the rowers in the crew can be changed before the games.  At the qualification regattas, it is the crew that wins that qualifies for the Olympics, and if members of that crew race in the Olympics they must race in that event.

Medal table
The numbers below are after the 2020 Summer Olympics in Tokyo.

Rowing medal leaders (by Summer Olympiad)

Multiple medallists

The table shows those who have won at least 3 gold medals.

Men's events

Women's events

Nations
Number of rowers from each nation by year of Olympics, starting with 1896 (when none competed due to bad weather) then 1900 through 2020.

Venues

See also
 Rowing at the Summer Paralympics
 List of rowing venues - includes Olympic venues and non Olympic venues
 New Zealand rowers at the Summer Olympics

References

External links
Olympic Rowing Medalists at HickokSports.com

 
Summer Olympics
Sports at the Summer Olympics